Nutgrove Shopping Centre is one of two shopping centres located in Rathfarnham, a southern suburb of Dublin. The centre was built on part of the old Lamb's Jam orchards.

The first drive-through restaurant (a McDonald's drive-thru) in Europe opened at the centre in 1985. The centre was also the site of an experiment, with Ireland's first social welfare services office within a shopping centre sited here. 

The centre has nearly 1,000 free surface car parking spaces, 70 shops, 5 restaurants and a food court.

Nutgrove Shopping Centre is directly served by bus routes 17, 61, 75, 161, 175 and nearby by route 14.

See also
List of shopping malls in Ireland

References

External links
 Official site

Rathfarnham
Shopping centres in County Dublin
Buildings and structures in Dún Laoghaire–Rathdown